Edwin Kwabla Gadayi (14 February 2001) is a Ghanaian sprinter. In April 2021, he was named in the five-member men's team who took part in the World Athletics Relays in Silesia, Poland. He took part in the semi-finals of the 200m at the African Games in Morocco where he was 4th (20.92s). In July 2022, he set a national record in the 200 meters at the 2023 Invitational Championship held in Cape Coast at a time of 20.848 seconds.

Early life and education 
Gadayi is based in the Ashanti Region of Ghana. He is a student of University of Cape Coast.

Honors 
He won the bronze medal at the African U20 Championships.

He also emerged as the winner in the Ghana Athletics Association's Open Championship event held at the Paa Joe Park in KNUST.

Achievements

References 

2001 births
University of Cape Coast alumni
Living people
Ghanaian male sprinters
Athletes (track and field) at the 2019 African Games
Ghanaian sportspeople